Pau Gaspar Tonnesen Ricart (born 24 October 1992) is a male decathlete representing Spain. His mother is Spanish and his father is American. He competed at the 2015 World Championships and the 2016 Summer Olympics.

International competitions

References

External links
 

Spanish decathletes
Spanish male athletes
American male decathletes
Track and field athletes from Arizona
Living people
Sportspeople from Tempe, Arizona
1992 births
World Athletics Championships athletes for Spain
Athletes (track and field) at the 2016 Summer Olympics
Olympic athletes of Spain
Arizona Wildcats men's track and field athletes